(also known as Nobu Tsujii) is a Japanese pianist and composer. He was born blind due to microphthalmia. Tsujii performs extensively, with a large number of conductors and orchestras, and has received critical acclaims as well as notices for his unique techniques for learning music and performing with an orchestra while being unable to see.

Early life and education
Nobuyuki Tsujii was born blind due to microphthalmia. From an early age, he exhibited exceptional talent and musical ability. At age two, he began to play "Do Re Mi" on a toy piano after hearing his mother hum the tune. He began formal piano study at the age of four. In 1995, at age seven, Tsujii won the first prize at the All Japan Music of Blind Students by the Tokyo Helen Keller Association. In 1998, at age ten, he debuted with the Century Orchestra, Osaka.

He gave his first piano recital in the small hall of Tokyo's Suntory Hall at age 12. Subsequently, he made his overseas debut with performances in the United States, France, and Russia. In October 2005, he reached the semifinal and received the Critics’ Award at the 15th International Frédéric Chopin Piano Competition held in Warsaw, Poland.

In April 2007, Tsujii entered Ueno Gakuen University majoring in music performance in piano, graduating in March 2011.

Career
Tsujii competed in the 2009 Van Cliburn International Piano Competition and tied for the gold medal with Haochen Zhang. He was also awarded the Beverley Taylor Smith Award for the best performance of a new work. He played all twelve of Frédéric Chopin's Études (Op. 10) as part of his performance in the preliminaries. Tsuji was one of the competitors prominently featured in the Peter Rosen documentary film about the 2009 Van Cliburn competition, A Surprise in Texas, which was first broadcast on PBS TV in 2010.

In addition to being a pianist, Tsujii is a composer. At age 12, he performed his own composition "Street Corner of Vienna". He has since released numerous albums of his own compositions. He is also a film music composer and the 2011 recipient of the Japan Film Critics Award for Film Music.

On November 10, 2011, Tsujii made his debut in the main hall (Isaac Stern Auditorium) at Carnegie Hall in New York, as part of the Keyboard Virtuosos II series.

Tsujii debuted at the BBC Proms on July 16, 2013, with a performance with the BBC Philharmonic conducted by Juanjo Mena.

Tsujii is featured in a 2013 English textbook for high schools in Japan. A 2014 film Touching the Sound, also by Peter Rosen, documents Tsujii's life from birth to his 2011 Carnegie Hall debut, including footage of his visit to the region in Japan that suffered the devastating aftermath of the 2011 Tōhoku earthquake and tsunami.

He won the 1st Prize at the InterArtia 2015 international competition by the International Art Society in Volos, Greece.

Music

Method
Tsujii learns new musical works strictly by ear. A 2009 Time article explains: "Certainly, being blind hasn't made it easy. Tsujii can use Braille music scores to learn new pieces, but this kind of translation is usually done by volunteers. Because demand is so low, the variety of scores available does not meet the needs of a professional performer, so Tsujii has devised his own method. A team of pianists records scores along with specific codes and instructions written by composers, which Tsujii listens to and practices until he learns and perfects each piece."

Tsujii said in a 2011 interview, "I learn pieces by listening, but it doesn't mean I'm copying CDs or another person's interpretation. I ask my assistants to make a special cassette tape for me. They split the piece into small sections, such as several bars, and record it (one hand at a time). I call these tapes 'music sheets for ears.' It takes me a few days to complete a short piece, but it takes one month to complete a big sonata or concerto."

Performance technique

In 2017, a reporter from the Australian Broadcasting Corporation, Monique Schafter, asked Tsujii "How do you stay in time when you can't see the conductor?" The pianist replied: " By listening to the conductor's breath and also sensing what's happening around me." The late conductor Bramwell Tovey commented: "He must have very acute hearing, I'm sure."

Recordings
Tsujii has an extensive discography.

Following is a list of his CDs and DVDs, most recent first:

Conductors and orchestras 

Tsujii has performed with numerous orchestras under the baton of many conductors, both in Japan and abroad. Conductors that he performed with in recent years include:

 Vladimir Ashkenazy (Philharmonia Orchestra, Orchestra Ensemble Kanazawa, Sydney Symphony Orchestra, Deutsches Symphonie-Orchester Berlin and Iceland Symphony Orchestra)
 Valery Gergiev (Mariinsky Theatre Orchestra, Orchestra Teatro alla Scala and Munich Philharmonic)
 Vladimir Spivakov (Moscow Virtuosi Chamber Orchestra)
 Vasily Petrenko (Royal Liverpool Philharmonic)
 Bramwell Tovey(Sydney Symphony Orchestra)
 Vladimir Jurowski (London Philharmonic Orchestra)
 Michael Sanderling (Dresden Philharmonic, Romanian Youth Orchestra)
 Kent Nagano (Hamburg Philharmonic)
 Andrew Manze (NDR Radiophilharmonie)
 Patrick Hahn Orchestra Ensemble Kanazawa
 Yutaka Sado (Tonkünstler Orchestra, BBC Philharmonic, Deutsches Symphonie-Orchester Berlin)
 James Conlon (Fort Worth Symphony Orchestra)
 Miguel Harth-Bedoya (Fort Worth Symphony Orchestra)
 Darrell Ang (Royal Liverpool Philharmonic)
 Marko Letonja (Orchestre philharmonique de Strasbourg)
 Neil Thomson(Yomiuri Nippon Symphony Orchestra)
 Juanjo Mena (BBC Philharmonic)
 Randall Craig Fleischer( Hudson Valley Philharmonic, Youngstown Symphony Orchestra)
 John Giordano (Corpus Christi Symphony Orchestra)
 Thierry Fischer (Swiss Italian Orchestra)
 Jean-Marie Zeitouni ( Edmonton Symphony Orchestra)
 Paolo Carignani (Yomiuri Nippon Symphony Orchestra)
 Mitiyoshi Inoue(Orchestra Ensemble Kanazawa)
 Yuzo Toyama (NHK Symphony Orchestra )
 Eliahu Inbal (Tokyo Metropolitan Symphony Orchestra)
 Michael Collins (Sinfonieorchester Basel)
 Lukasz Borowicz (Poznan Philharmonic Orchestra)
 Kazuyoshi Akiyama (Hiroshima Symphony Orchestra)
 Tatsuya Shimono (Yomiuri Nippon Symphony Orchestra, Hiroshima Symphony Orchestra)
 Alexander Mickelthwate (Winnipeg Symphony Orchestra)
 Stilian Kirov (substituting for Ludovic Morlot) (Seattle Symphony Orchestra)
 Arild Remmereit (Baltimore Symphony Orchestra
 Andriy Yurkevych (Munich Symphony Orchestra)
 Scott Speck (Mobile Symphony Orchestra)
 Kaspar Zehnder (Sinfonieorchester Basel)
 Pascal Rophé (substituting for Marc Minkowski) (Orchestra Ensemble Kanazawa)
 Yuko Tanaka (Orchestra Ensemble Kanazawa)
 Michiyoshi Inoue (Orchestra Ensemble Kanazawa)
 Ronald Feldman (Longwood Symphony Orchestra)
 Sylvain Cambreling (Yomiuri Nippon Symphony Orchestra)
 Christopher Warren-Green(Yomiuri Nippon Symphony Orchestra)
 Tetsuji Honna (Tokyo Philharmonic Orchestra)
 Kosuke Tsunoda (Tokyo Philharmonic Orchestra)
 Kazuki Yamada, Yokohama Sinfonietta
 Robert Trevino, Orchestra Sinfonica di Milano Giuseppe Verdi
 Naoto Ōtomo,Ryukyu Symphony orchestra
 Fumiaki Miura, ARK sinfonietta
 Ryusuke Numajiri, (Yomiuri Nippon Symphony Orchestra)
 Takeshi Oi, (Tokyo Kosei Wind Orchestra)
 Louis Langrée (Los Angeles Philharmonic)
 Sebastian Weigle (Yomiuri Nippon Symphony Orchestra)
 Domingo Hindoyan (Royal Liverpool Philharmonic)
 Erik Nielsen (conductor) (Bilbao Orkestra Sinfonikoa) 
 Jiří Rožeň (Seattle Symphony)
 Peter Oundjian (Sarasota Orchestra) 

Tsujii has also performed with the Takács Quartet, the Orpheus Chamber Orchestra and the Chamber Orchestra of Europe.

Piano concertos 
Piano concertos that Tsujii has performed include Piano Concerto No. 1 (Beethoven), Piano Concerto No. 2 (Beethoven), Piano Concerto No. 3 (Beethoven), Piano Concerto No. 5 (Beethoven), Piano Concerto No. 1 (Tchaikovsky), Piano Concerto No. 3 (Prokofiev), Piano Concerto (Grieg), Piano Concerto No. 2 (Rachmaninoff), Piano Concerto No. 3 (Rachmaninoff), Piano Concerto No. 20 (Mozart), Piano Concerto No. 21 (Mozart), Piano Concerto No. 26 (Mozart), Piano Concerto No. 27 (Mozart), Piano Concerto No. 1 (Chopin), Piano Concerto No. 2 (Chopin), Piano Concerto in G (Ravel), Piano Concerto No. 1 (Liszt), Piano Concerto No. 1 (Shostakovich) and Piano Concerto for Nobuuiki Tsujii by Shigeaki Saegusa . He has also performed Gershwin's Rhapsody in Blue and Rachmaninov's Rhapsody on a Theme of Paganini.

Compositions 
In addition to being a pianist, Tsujii is a composer.

At age 12, he performed his own composition "Street Corner of Vienna."

In 2010–2011, he composed the theme music for a Japanese film '神様のカルテ (In His Chart)', for which he was named the 2011 Film Music Artist by the Japan Film Critics Award. That same year, he also composed the theme music for a Japanese TV drama 'それでも、生きてゆく (Still We Live On)'.

In June 2011, Japanese figure skating champion Midori Ito performed in a world event (Master Elite Oberstdorf 2011) to the music of "Whisper of the River," composed by Tsujii when he was in high school to express his love for his father after the two took a walk on the Kanda River in Tokyo.

Tsujii was the music director and composed the theme music for the Japanese film はやぶさ 遥かなる帰還 The Return of the Hayabusa released in February 2012. In 2014, he composed the ending theme for the film 'マエストロ(Maestro!)'.

In 2016, Tsujii created and performed the background music for a series of three animation of Chōjū-jinbutsu-giga scrolls produced by Studio Ghibli for Marubeni Corporation.

Tsujii's 2011 performance of his own composition, "Elegy for the Victims of the Tsunami of March 11, 2011 in Japan", is widely viewed on the Internet.

At the 2020 Summer Paralympics opening ceremony, a recording of a composition by Tsujii ("House of Wind") was played while the flag of Japan was carried on stage.

Performances in Japan 
In his native country, Nobuyuki Tsujii often appears in prestigious performances of national significance.  On June 29, 2019, he performed in Osaka for leaders from the Group of 20 major economies.  On November 9, 2019, Tsujii performed at the National Celebration for the Enthronement of Emperor Naruhito.

Charity 
In the wake of Japan's 2011 Tōhoku earthquake and tsunami, Tsujii made numerous contributions to the restoration efforts. He was featured in an original short film "Lights of Japan" shown at the World Economics Summit in Davos, Switzerland, in January 2012.
In the film, he performed on a grand piano restored from the ravage of the March 2011 tsunami that devastated Eastern Japan. Additionally, he performed in numerous charity concerts on behalf of Japan's 2011 earthquake and tsunami victims, including a UNESCO concert held in Paris on March 11, 2012. Part of the proceeds from his 2012 Flowers Bloom CD goes towards Japan's earthquake reconstruction effort.

In addition to his earthquake relief effort, Tsujii frequently performs benefit concerts, such as for children's hospitals, the Japanese Red Cross and the disabled.

In the summer of 2012, Tsujii contributed to a one-million rubles donation from the proceeds of an acclaimed concert, in which he performed on July 8 with conductor Valery Gergiev and the Mariinsky Theatre Orchestra, to the victims of a flood in Kuban that occurred the night before.

On October 25, 2015, Tsujii performed with the Longwood Symphony Orchestra in Boston, in partnership with the Japan Society of Boston and the Berklee College of Music, benefiting the Boston Higashi School and the Fukushima Youth Sinfonietta.
On the next day, Tsujii paid a special visit to the Higashi School and "inspired children and staff alike."

In Taiwan on April 15, 2019, Tsujii visited the Taichung Hui Ming School for the Blind at the invitation of the TSMC Culture and Education Foundation, where he performed and spoke to the students, encouraging them to fulfill their potentials.

On March 11, 2021, the 10th anniversary of Japan's 2011 Tōhoku earthquake and tsunami, Tsujii performed in a special concert at Nippon Budokan Hall in Tokyo "to bring together those affected by the disasters and those who have offered support for reconstruction."

Accolades

Van Cliburn is quoted as having told the Fort Worth Star-Telegram, "He was absolutely miraculous. His performance had the power of a healing service. It was truly divine." 2009 Van Cliburn Competition Juror Richard Dyer, a chief music critic for The Boston Globe, said, "Very seldom do I close my notebook and just give myself over to it, and he made that necessary. I didn't want to be interrupted in what I was hearing."

2009 Van Cliburn Competition Juror Michel Béroff, an award-winning internationally known pianist, told the Japanese monthly piano magazine Chopin, "The special thing about his performance is his sound. It has depth, color and contrast, the genuine music."

In the documentary A Surprise in Texas, Menahem Pressler, Cliburn juror and an eminent pianist, says: "I have the utmost admiration for [Tsujii]. God has taken his eyes, but given him the physical endowment and mental endowment to encompass the greatest works of piano. For him to play the Chopin concerto with such sweetness, gentleness and sincerity -- it's deeply touching. I had to keep from crying when I left the room."

Scott Cantrell in his review of the 2009 Van Cliburn competition for The Dallas Morning News wrote that "It's almost beyond imagining that he has learned scores as formidable as Rachmaninoff’s Second Piano Concerto and Beethoven's Hammerklavier Sonata by ear…Through all three rounds, he played with unfailing assurance, and his unforced, utterly natural Chopin E-Minor Piano Concerto was an oasis of loveliness."

John Giordano, music director and conductor of Corpus Christi Symphony Orchestra who was jury chairman for the Cliburn competition, said in 2010, "He’s amazing. We closed our eyes and it’s so phenomenal that it’s hard to withhold your tears. 
Nobu played the most difficult hour-long Beethoven piece (Hammerklavier, Sonata no. 29) flawlessly. For anyone, it’s extraordinary. But for someone blind who learns by ear, it’s mind-boggling."

In an interview after the November 2011 Carnegie Hall debut recital of Tsujii, Van Cliburn said on TV Asahi, "What a thrill to hear this brilliant, very gifted, fabulous pianist. You feel God's presence in the room when he played. His soul is so pure. His music is so wonderful, and it goes to infinity to the highest heaven."

In a 2014 review in The Daily Telegraph, David Fanning wrote, "...Nobuyuki Tsujii’s performance of Prokofiev’s Piano Concerto No. 3. This was not just supersonic in its tempos but remarkably clean, and also responsive to the fairy-tale poetry that sets off the steely aggression." On Tsujii's debut performance with the Munich Philharmonic on November 4, 2015, the Münchner Merkur wrote "At first he seems a little uncertain, but as soon as he sits down at the piano, he is like a different person. The supposed handicap turns out to be his strength: The Japanese sinks into Beethoven's fifth piano concerto. The high chords of the second movement seem to float with his feather-light touch."

Upon the conclusion of a tour in Japan with Tsujii in November 2015, conductor Valery Gergiev said: "He is not only a great musician and star in Japan, he shows that the human resources are virtually limitless. He shows that there is practically nothing that a human being cannot do."

Conductor Bramwell Tovey, who performed with Tsujii and the Sydney Symphony Orchestra at the Sydney Opera House in May 2017, made this comment: "There are lots of pianists who find Chopin baffling. But he's found a way that almost simplifies it, without simplifying any of the technical difficulties, and I mean he makes light of the technical difficulties. He has just found a way to express all of those different emotions on the journey until in the end there's just this incredible feeling of for me, sunlight. I just love playing with him."

In 2017, on the tenth anniversary of Tsujii's career début, pianist-conductor Vladimir Ashkenazy commented: "Nobuyuki Tsujii is one of my very favourite young pianists. He possesses a rare combination of excellent pianism and genuinely expressive musicianship. It is always a great pleasure to work with him and I wish him a future of many wonderful concerts." In a 2018 TV documentary filmed in Iceland, Ashkenazy stated: "It is such a pleasure to play with him, to accompany him because he is so musical, so clear, and I can always understand what he wants to do with music -- that makes accompaniment sort of natural and, in a way, easy. He is so musical, so organic that it is very easy to accompany him. I am very pleased to accompany such a good artist."

Japanese composer Takayuki Hattori wrote: (Translated from Japanese) "The music of Nobuyuki Tsujii is guileless. There is no excessive decoration. He plays the piano with a minimum amount of flourish as required by God. He is one of a few in existence qualified to play the works dedicated to the God of Music by composers. He inspires courage to live and engenders food for thought. It is a pleasure to be alive in the same era as this rare pianist."

Japanese composer Joe Hisaishi, who teamed with Tsujii for the ending theme music of a 2018 film A Forest of Wool and Steel, commented (Translated from Japanese) "Mr. Tsujii is a really wonderful pianist, especially the sense of rhythm is amazing. A neat rhythm without useless things."

References

External links
 
 "Artist Profile: Nobuyuki Tsujii", Avex Classics. 
 Parenting Square by Nobuyuki's mother, Itsuko Tsujii 
 Information for International Fans of Nobuyuki Tsujii
 "Meet Nobuyuki Tsujii, the blind concert pianist who learns by ear", ABC News Australia.

1988 births
21st-century classical composers
21st-century classical pianists
21st-century Japanese composers
21st-century Japanese male musicians
Blind classical musicians
Japanese blind people
Japanese classical composers
Japanese classical pianists
Japanese male classical composers
Japanese male classical pianists
Living people
Musicians from Tokyo
Prize-winners of the Van Cliburn International Piano Competition